Horní Podluží (until 1947 Horní Grund) is a municipality and village in Děčín District in the Ústí nad Labem Region of the Czech Republic. It has about 800 inhabitants.

Administrative parts
Hamlets of Ladečka, Světlík and Žofín are administrative parts of Horní Podluží.

References

Villages in Děčín District